Gillacommain mac Niall (died 991) was king of Uí Díarmata.

Background

Gillacommain mac Niall was a member of the SíOl Muiredaig dynasty, who ruled as kings of The Connachta in what is now central County Roscommon. By the mid 10th-century they had expanded south-west into the north-east of County Galway. Here a branch of the kindred seized territory and renamed it Uí Díarmata, after its founder, Diarmada Finn mac Tomaltaig, who was in turn a great-grandson of King Indrechtach mac Muiredaig (died 723).

Death and successors

Gillacommain is not known to be attested in the genealogies, nor is there any other reference to him or his father, Niall. He was king in 991 but was at war with Cú Ceanain mac Tadhg, a son of his predecessor. The war ended with their mutual deaths, and another unattested member of the Uí Díarmata, Muirgheas mac Aedh, became king. Gillacommain left no known descendants, and after 999, all subsequent Uí Díarmata kings descended from Cú Ceanain mac Tadhg.

References

 The Tribes and Customs of Hy-Many, John O'Donovan, 1843
 The Parish of Ballinasloe, Fr. Jerome A. Fahey.
 https://www.webcitation.org/query?url=http://www.geocities.com/Athens/Aegean/2444/irish/LD.htm&date=2009-10-25+05:47:51
 Vol. 2 (AD 903–1171): edition and translation
 Annals of Ulster at CELT: Corpus of Electronic Texts at University College Cork
 Annals of Tigernach at CELT: Corpus of Electronic Texts at University College Cork
Revised edition of McCarthy's synchronisms at Trinity College Dublin.

People from County Galway
991 deaths
10th-century Irish monarchs
Year of birth unknown